A salpinx (plural salpinges ; Greek σαλπιγξ) was a trumpet-like instrument of the ancient Greeks.

Construction
The salpinx consisted of a straight, narrow bronze tube with a mouthpiece of bone and a bell (also constructed of bronze) of variable shape and size; extant descriptions describe conical, bulb-like, and spherical structures. Each type of bell may have had a unique effect on the sound made by the instrument.  The instrument has been depicted in some classical era vases as employing the use of a phorbeia, similar to those used by aulos players of the era.  Though similar to the Roman tuba, the salpinx was shorter than the approximately 1.5 meter long Roman tuba.  A rare example of a salpinx, held at the Museum of Fine Arts, Boston, is unique in that it is constructed from thirteen sections of bone connected using tenons and sockets (with bronze ferrules) rather than the long, bronze tube described elsewhere. This salpinx is over 1.57 m long dwarfing the common salpinx which is estimated to have been around 0.8 – 1.20 m long.

Origin

The trumpet is found in many early civilizations and therefore makes it difficult to discern when and where the long, straight trumpet design found in the salpinx originated.   References to the salpinx are found frequently in Greek literature and art.  Early descriptions of the sound of the salpinx can be found in Homer’s Iliad (9th or 8th century BC), however, this Archaic reference is exceptional and frequent references are not found until the Classical period.  Similar instruments can be found in Anatolia, Mesopotamia, and Egypt, though the salpinx is most closely related to the Egyptian version.  References to the salpinx in classical literature include mention of the instrument as tyrrhene  a derivative of Tyrrhenoi, an exonym often employed by the Greeks as an allusion to the Etruscan people.  Bronze instruments were important among the Etruscans and as a people they were held in high regard by the Greeks for their musical contributions.  The salpinx as an Etruscan invention is thus supported by the Greeks and various descriptions can be found among the authors Aeschylus, Pollux, and Sophocles.  It is likely that the salpinx was introduced to the Greeks in some way through the Etruscans, however, scattered references to the salpinx prior to Greek contact with the Etruscans, as well as the myriad salpinx type instruments described by Eustathius of Thessalonia,<ref>Nikos Xanthoulis, "The Salpinx in Greek Antiquity," International Trumpet Guild Journal', October 2006, 41</ref> suggests some small level of uncertainty in regard to whether or not the instrument came to the Greeks directly from the Etruscans or through some intermediary source.

Uses

When encountered in Greek art and literature, the salpinx is usually depicted as being played by a soldier.  Fifth century authors frequently associated its "piercing sound" with war; the instrument often being used for signalling, summoning crowds and beginning chariot races.  This is supported in the writing of Aristotle who, in De audibilibus, explained that salpinges were used as "...instruments of summons in war, at the games, and so on, not to make music."  Aristides Quintilianus described the necessity of the salpinx and salpingtis (a player of the salpinx) in battle in his treatise, On Music''. He explains that each command to troops was given using specific tones or "melodies" played on the salpinx.  This action allowed for an entire army to receive a command at once as well as provide a level of secrecy as these salpinx calls were specific to a group and would be unknown to an opponent. Yet despite its distinctive sound, the shrill blasts of the salpinx would have had a difficult time overcoming the clashing of metal, the cries of the wounded, the roars of aggression from rows of soldiers. This is why the salpinx was primarily used before battle to summon men to prepare for battle and to sound the charge.

Andrew Barker, however, describes a possible exception to the utilitarian usage of the salpinx referencing Aristotle, who wrote, "...that is why everyone, when engaging in revelry, relaxes the tension of the breath in playing the salpinx, so as to make the sound as gentle as possible." It is suggested here that the salpinx may have found use in festive occasions as well as war.  This notion is corroborated by Nikos Xanthoulis in his article "The Salpinx in Greek Antiquity".  Here, he draws particular attention to Aristotle's statement that "...participants of a komos unbend the tension of the exhaling air in the salpinx, in order to make the sound smoother."  The komos, a street festival with music and dance, would require an "unbending of tension" in order to create a more pleasing tone thus indicating a usage for the instrument outside of the military. Another more universal function of the salpinx was to use it as a means of bringing silence to a rambunctious crowd or at a large gathering. This was both useful in a societal setting in places such as large assemblies and as a tool to quiet soldiers while a general addressed his men.

Modern
The sound of the salpinx was being digitally recreated by the Ancient Instruments Sound/Timbre Reconstruction Application (ASTRA) project which uses physical modeling synthesis to simulate the sound of the salpinx.  Due to the complexity of this process, the ASTRA project uses grid computing on hundreds of computers throughout Europe to model the sounds.

The Salpinx is part of the Lost Sounds Orchestra, alongside other ancient instruments whose sounds have been recreated by ASTRA, including the epigonion, the aulos, the barbiton and the syrinx.

See also
 History of primitive and non-Western trumpets

References

External links
 http://www.tapsbugler.com/HistoryoftheBugle/HistoryoftheBugle2.html

Ancient Greek musical instruments
Natural horns and trumpets